Jungitu is a village in Álava, Basque Autonomous Community, Spain.

References

Populated places in Álava